Pavel Kulikov (born 14 January 1992) is a Russian professional ice hockey Forward who currently plays with Avtomobilist Yekaterinburg in the Kontinental Hockey League (KHL).

Playing career
During the 2011–12 KHL season, Kulikov made his KHL debut playing in one game with HC Neftekhimik Nizhnekamsk. Prior to the 2018–19 season, Kulikov has spent the entirety of his professional career within the Neftekhimik Nizhnekamsk organization.

Following the 2019–20 season, his ninth season with Nizhnekamsk, Kulikov left as a free agent for the first time in his career, agreeing to a two-year contract with Avtomobilist Yekaterinburg on 5 May 2020.

References

External links

1992 births
Living people
Avtomobilist Yekaterinburg players
HC Neftekhimik Nizhnekamsk players
Russian ice hockey forwards
People from Nizhnekamsk
Sportspeople from Tatarstan